Quadriptilia rectangulodactyla is a moth of the family Pterophoridae. It is known from Peru.

The wingspan is about 27 mm. Adults are on wing in June and December.

External links

Pterophorinae
Moths described in 1994
Taxa named by Cees Gielis
Moths of South America